Mamayi Mosque (sometimes called Mamay Mosque) is an Azerbaijani mosque located in Shusha, Azerbaijan about  from the capital Baku. The mosque is located on G. Asgarov street of Mamayi neighborhood of Shusha. Mamayi neighbourhood is the 4th of 8 upper and earlier neighbourhoods of Shusha. In total, there are 17 neighbourhoods. Mamayi Mosque was one of the 17th mosques functioning in Shusha by the end of the 19th century. A few years before occupation of Shusha, Mamayi Mosque along with Ashaghi Govhar Agha, Yukhari Govhar Agha and Saatli mosques were renovated. The mosque was completely destroyed after occupation of Shusha in May 1992. It was under the control of the Armenian forces since the capture of Shusha on 8 May 1992. It returned to Azerbaijani control in 2020 following a three-day-long battle over Shusha. In January 2021, the Azerbaijani officials claimed that the mosque and a nearby fountain was vandalised by the Armenians forces during city's occupation.

See also
Yukhari Govhar Agha Mosque
Ashaghi Govhar Agha Mosque
Saatli Mosque
Seyidli Mosque
Khoja Marjanli Mosque
Guyulug Mosque
Taza Mahalla Mosque

References

External links

Interior of Mamayi Mosque before occupation and destruction
Exterior of Mamayi Mosque before occupation and destruction
Karabakh Monuments

19th-century mosques
Mosques in Shusha